Pogost is a rural locality (a village) in Yemetskoye Rural Settlement of Kholmogorsky District, Arkhangelsk Oblast, Russia. The population was 5 as of 2010.

References 

Rural localities in Kholmogorsky District